Orbital part may refer to:

 Orbital part of frontal bone
 Orbital part of inferior frontal gyrus